The Cruz family is a Filipino family of entertainers.

List of members

 Tirso Cruz Sr.
  ∞ married Unknown
 Cesar Cruz, Sr. 
 ∞ married Milagros Velez; they had three children: Ricky, Beth and Danny.
 Ricky Belmonte 
 ∞ married Rosemarie Sonora, they had three children: Renzo, Sheryl and Patrick.
 Sheryl Cruz
 Renzo Cruz 
 Beth Cruz 
 ∞ married Rodolfo L. Ilustre, they had three children: Rayver, Rodjun and Omat.
 Rodjun Cruz
  ∞ married Dianne Medina
 Rayver Cruz
 Danny Cruz 
 with Unknown, they had four children, Sunshine, Maritess, Michael and Maricel.
 Sunshine Cruz
  ∞ married Cesar Montano (annulled), they have three daughters: Angelina, Samantha, Cheska.
 Tirso Bailey Cruz Jr.  
 ∞ married Elma Acosta Silvano; they had three children
 Tirso Cruz III 
 ∞ married Erlinda Ynchausti, they had three children: TJ, Bodie and Djanin.
 TJ Cruz 
 Bodie Cruz 
 Djanin Cruz
 Father
 ∞ married Unknown
 Boyet Cruz 
 ∞ married Unknown, they had three children: Geneva, Aubrey, Vannessa, and EJ.
 Geneva Cruz
 with Paco Arespacochaga, had one son: Heaven.
 Yolly 
 ∞ married Unknown, they have two children: Donna and Jomar.
 Donna Cruz
 ∞ married Yong Larrazabal, they have three children.

References 

Cruz family
Show business families of the Philippines